Agile management is the application of the principles of Agile software development and Lean Management to various management processes, particularly product development and project management. Following the appearance of the Manifesto for Agile Software Development in 2001, Agile techniques started to spread into other areas of activity. The term Agile originates from Agile manufacturing - which in the early 90s had developed from Flexible manufacturing systems and Lean manufacturing/production.

In 2004, one of the authors of the original manifesto, Jim Highsmith, published Agile Project Management: Creating Innovative Products. 

The term "Agile Project Management" has not been picked up by any of the international organizations developing Project Management Standards.
 The ISO Standard ISO 21502:2020 refers to the term "agile" as a delivery approach of products (project scope).
 The PMBoK Standard published by the Project Management Institute refers to an "adaptive" type of development lifecycle also called "agile" or "change-driven" with regard to the product development lifecycle of a project (an element of the project lifecycle).

See also 
 Scrum (software development)

References

Agile software development
Project management